Parcyrhun Halt railway station served the town of Ammanford, Carmarthenshire, Wales from 1936 to 1955 on the Llanelly Railway.

History 
The station opened on 4 May 1936 by the Great Western Railway. It closed to both passengers and goods traffic on 13 June 1955.

References

External links 

Disused railway stations in Carmarthenshire
Former Great Western Railway stations
Railway stations in Great Britain opened in 1936
Railway stations in Great Britain closed in 1955
1936 establishments in Wales